Peebles is a hamlet in the Canadian province of Saskatchewan.

Demographics 

References

Chester No. 125, Saskatchewan
Designated places in Saskatchewan
Organized hamlets in Saskatchewan
Division No. 5, Saskatchewan